Aleksander Marek Kowalski (7 October 1902 – 3 April 1940) was a Polish ice hockey defenceman who competed in the 1928 Winter Olympics and in the 1932 Winter Olympics.

He was born in Warsaw, Poland and was killed in the Katyn massacre, aged 37. His family received the last postcard on 11 February 1940. His exact date of death is unknown, but he was on the list of the NKVD dated 3 April 1940.

In 1928 he participated with the Polish ice hockey team in the Olympic tournament.

Four years later he was a member of the Polish team which finished fourth in the 1932 Olympic tournament. He played all six matches and scored two goals. This made him the top scorer for the team, scoring two out of the team's three goals

References

External links

 profile

Further reading 
The murderers of Katyn by Vladimir Abaeinov Hippocrene Books, 1993 

1902 births
1940 deaths
AZS Warszawa (ice hockey) players
Executed people from Masovian Voivodeship
Ice hockey players at the 1928 Winter Olympics
Ice hockey players at the 1932 Winter Olympics
Katyn massacre victims
Olympic ice hockey players of Poland
Polish ice hockey defencemen
Sportspeople from Warsaw
People from Warsaw Governorate
Polish military personnel killed in World War II